Tora-Con is an annual two-day anime convention held during April at the Rochester Institute of Technology in Rochester, New York. The conventions name comes from the Japanese word 'tora' meaning tiger and is organized by the Rochester Institute of Technology Anime Club. The event is family friendly.

Programming
The convention typically offers an animated music video contest, anime showings, artists alley, concerts, contests, cosplay chess tournament, cosplay contest, cosplay dating game, dances, gaming tournaments, iron cosplay, panels, and performances.

History
Tora-Con was founded to raise money for the anime club. They hit an attendance capacity of 2,500 in 2010 and had to close registration. The convention celebrated its 10th anniversary in 2014. In 2014, the event expanded to additional parts of campus and capped attendance at 3,000 people. Tora-Con 2020 was cancelled due to the COVID-19 pandemic. Tora-Con held a virtual convention in 2021 due to the COVID-19 pandemic.

Event history

References

External links
 

Rochester Institute of Technology
Anime conventions in the United States
Recurring events established in 2005
2005 establishments in New York (state)
Annual events in New York (state)
Festivals in Rochester, New York
Conventions in New York (state)